Sebastian Döhrer (born ) is a German male  track cyclist, riding for the national team. He competed in the sprint event at the 2011 UCI Track Cycling World Championships.

References

External links
 Profile at cyclingarchives.com

1985 births
Living people
German track cyclists
German male cyclists
Place of birth missing (living people)
People from Suhl
Cyclists from Thuringia
People from Bezirk Suhl
21st-century German people